Surunga Municipality (Nepali: सुरुङ्‍गा नगरपालिका) is located in Saptari District in the Province 2 of Nepal. It was formed in 2016 occupying current 11 sections (wards) merging previous Pipra, Hardiya, Daulatpur, Madhupati, Kushaha, Haripur, Malhanwa, Tikulya, Pramanpur (ward no.09) and Patewarba VDCs. It occupies an area of 107.04 km2 with a total population of 44,221.

References 

Populated places in Saptari District
Nepal municipalities established in 2017
Municipalities in Madhesh Province